The United Kingdom government crisis may refer to:

 South Sea Bubble collapse of 1722
 Excise Crisis of 1733
 1727 Succession Crisis
 Cider dispute of 1763
 Stamp Act Crisis of 1765
 Corsican Crisis of 1768
 Falklands Crisis of 1770
 Succession crisis of 1812
 Peterloo Crisis of 1819
 Bedchamber crisis
 Don Pacifico affair
 Orsini affair
 Khartoum Crisis
 1892 vote of no confidence in the Salisbury ministry
 1895 vote of no confidence in the Rosebery ministry
 1910 constitutional crisis
 Shell Crisis of 1915
 Conscription Crisis of 1918
 Gallipoli Crisis
 Chanak Crisis
 Abdication crisis of 1936
 Munich Crisis
 1940 British war cabinet crisis
 Suez Crisis
 Night of the Long Knives (1962)
 1976 sterling crisis
 1979 vote of no confidence in the Callaghan ministry
 Westland affair
 1992 Sterling crisis
 1993 vote of confidence in the Major ministry
 Resignation of David Cameron
 2018 British cabinet reshuffle
 Resignation of Theresa May
 July 2022 United Kingdom government crisis
 September 2022 United Kingdom mini-budget
 October 2022 United Kingdom government crisis